The 2022 Liqui Moly Bathurst 12 Hour was an endurance race staged on the Mount Panorama Circuit in Bathurst, New South Wales, Australia, on 15 May 2022. It was the opening round of the 2022 Intercontinental GT Challenge. The race was originally planned to be held on 27 February 2022, but was postponed to May due to concerns with the COVID-19 quarantine regulations of Australia.

Class structure
Entries were divided into classes based on car type and driver ratings.
 Class A – GT3 (current-specification GT3 cars)
 Class APA (Pro-Am) - for driving combinations featuring two FIA Platinum- or FIA Gold-rated drivers and one or two FIA Bronze-rated drivers.
 Class AAM (Am) - for driving combinations featuring at most one FIA Silver-rated driver, with the remaining drivers being FIA Bronze-rated.
 Class B – GT3 Trophy (older-specification GT3 cars)
 Pro-Am - for driving combinations featuring at most one FIA Silver-rated driver, with the remaining drivers being FIA Bronze-rated.
 Am - for driving combinations featuring only FIA Bronze-rated drivers.
 Class C –  Porsche GT3 Cup Car
 Class D – GT4 cars
 Class I – Invitational class
 Class I was open to MARC Cars, GT2 cars and GTC cars from one-make categories.

There were no entries in Classes B and D.

Entry list

Qualifying 
Qualifying was split into two sessions, with Class A cars required to have an FIA Bronze-rated driver take part in the first and a higher-rated driver take part in the second. Results were formed by taking the aggregate times for each car from the two sessions. Class leaders are shown in bold.

Top Ten Shootout
Due to concerns over low tyre temperature, the traditional one-lap shootout was replaced by two fifteen minute sessions, the first for 6th to 10th positions in the qualifying session and the second from 1st to 5th positions.

Race
Class winners are shown in bold.

References

External links

Motorsport in Bathurst, New South Wales
Bathurst 12 Hour